Rudison Nogueira Ferreira (born 15 February 1983), or simply Rudison, is a Brazilian football midfielder.

Career
Born in Mariana, Minas Gerais, Brazil, his career started in 1994 in Brazilian giant São Paulo, where he made his formation alongside players like Kaká and Grafite. He stayed there six seasons. In 2000, he decided to move to Europe to play in Serbia in the back then First League of FR Yugoslavia; first one season in Borac Čačak, then another in OFK Beograd. In 2003, he moved to France where he played in several clubs, including two seasons with Ligue 2 club SCO Angers, and one and a half in Le Havre AC. In 2007, he had a short spell in Morocco playing with Difaa El Jadida playing in the Moroccan Championship. In summer 2007, he moved to Belgium where he first played in Jupiter League club Zulte-Waregem, and, since 2008, in K.V. Oostende in Belgian Second Division. In the 2009-10 season he played with Romanian Liga I side Ceahlăul Piatra Neamț. During 2010 he had a spell with JS Saint-Pierroise in the Réunion Premier League and with FC Dieppe back in France. In the summer of 2011 Rudison moved to Turan Tovuz in the Azerbaijan Premier League before leaving them in the winter transfer window of the same season after eleven games.

External links
 
 

1983 births
Living people
Sportspeople from Minas Gerais
Brazilian footballers
Brazilian expatriate footballers
Association football midfielders
São Paulo FC players
FK Borac Čačak players
OFK Beograd players
Expatriate footballers in Serbia
Angers SCO players
Le Havre AC players
Ligue 2 players
Expatriate footballers in France
Expatriate footballers in Morocco
S.V. Zulte Waregem players
K.V. Oostende players
Belgian Pro League players
Expatriate footballers in Belgium
CSM Ceahlăul Piatra Neamț players
Liga I players
Expatriate footballers in Romania
JS Saint-Pierroise players
Expatriate footballers in Réunion
Turan-Tovuz IK players
Expatriate footballers in Azerbaijan
SO Romorantin players
Expatriate footballers in Serbia and Montenegro
Brazilian expatriate sportspeople in Serbia and Montenegro
Brazilian expatriate sportspeople in France
Brazilian expatriate sportspeople in Morocco
Brazilian expatriate sportspeople in Belgium
Brazilian expatriate sportspeople in Romania
Brazilian expatriate sportspeople in Azerbaijan
Brazilian expatriate sportspeople in Réunion